The Constitution of Palau, Constitution of the Republic of Palau was adopted by the Palau Constitutional Convention from January 28 to April 2, 1979, ratified at the Third Constitution Referendum on July 9, 1980, and entered into force January 1, 1981. The Second Constitutional Convention certifies the proposed amendments to the Constitution of the Republic of Palau that were duly adopted by majority vote of the Delegates on July 15, 2005.

References 

Law of Palau
Palau